
Gmina Kobierzyce is a rural gmina (administrative district) in Wrocław County, Lower Silesian Voivodeship, in south-western Poland. Its seat is the village of Kobierzyce.

It is part of the Wrocław metropolitan area.

The gmina has a revenue per capita of 8096 PLN (~$3000) and is one of the highest results in Poland. Gmina Kobierzyce is located near the city Wrocław and to the North part (in Bielany Wrocławskie) there are the biggest shopping centres in Poland and one of the biggest in Europe (Centrum Bielany, Castorama, Ikea, Obi, Tesco, "Piotr i Paweł", Makro, Black Red White, Office Depot, Komfort, Euro RTV AGD, Electro World, Media Markt, Auchan, Agata Meble, Leroy Merlin and other kinds of shops). Near the Biskupice Podgórne there is a LG-Philips factory, which produces liquid crystal visual display units, and a Toshiba Corporation site. The A4 and A8 motorways and E67 and E261 European routes pass through the gmina.

Neighbouring gminas
Gmina Kobierzyce is bordered by the town of Wrocław and the gminas of Borów, Jordanów Śląski, Kąty Wrocławskie, Siechnice, Sobótka and Żórawina.

Villages
The gmina contains the villages of Bąki, Bielany Wrocławskie, Biskupice Podgórne, Budziszów, Chrzanów, Cieszyce, Damianowice, Dobkowice, Domasław, Jaszowice, Kobierzyce, Królikowice, Krzyżowice, Księginice, Kuklice, Magnice, Małuszów, Nowiny, Owsianka, Pełczyce, Pustków Wilczkowski, Pustków Żurawski, Racławice Wielkie, Rolantowice, Ślęza, Solna, Szczepankowice, Tyniec Mały, Tyniec nad Ślęzą, Wierzbice, Wysoka, Żerniki Małe and Żurawice.

References

Kobierzyce
Wrocław County